Elmer Bernstein is an American composer, conductor, and songwriter.

In a career that spanned more than five decades, he composed "some of the most recognizable and memorable themes in Hollywood history", including over 150 original film scores, as well as scores for nearly 80 television productions. For his work he received an Academy Award for Thoroughly Modern Millie (1967) and Primetime Emmy Award. He also received seven Golden Globe Award, five Grammy Award, and two Tony Award nominations.

He composed and arranged scores for over 100 film scores including such films as Sudden Fear (1952), The Man with the Golden Arm (1955), The Ten Commandments (1956), Sweet Smell of Success (1957), The Magnificent Seven (1960), To Kill a Mockingbird (1962), The Great Escape (1963), Hud (1963), Thoroughly Modern Millie (1967), True Grit (1969), My Left Foot, The Grifters (1990), Cape Fear (1991) and Far from Heaven (2002).

Major associations

Academy Awards

Emmy Award

Golden Globe Award

Grammy Award

Tony Award

Miscellaneous awards

Chicago Film Critics Association

Los Angeles Film Critics Association

National Board of Review

Phoenix Film Critics Society

Seattle Film Critics Awards

Telluride Film Festival

Walk of Fame

References 

Lists of awards received by American musician